East Rosebud Creek is a creek in the U.S. state of Montana. It flows from Fossil Lake in the Custer Gallatin National Forest to Rosebud Creek.  of the creek are protected under the National Wild and Scenic Rivers System. It is considered a Class V river for recreational purposes and there are a multitude of recreational facilities such as campgrounds and hiking trails along the creek.

National Wild and Scenic River 
The creek is managed by the U.S. forest service.

See also 
 List of rivers of Montana
 List of National Wild and Scenic Rivers

References

Rivers of Carbon County, Montana
Wild and Scenic Rivers of the United States